Pashto TV is a Pashto-language family television channel based in Afghanistan and launched in 2010. It is owned by Liwal limited. The programs are based on the principles of Pashtoon people code of life. The main office of Pashto TV is located in Kabul, Afghanistan.

The channel is part of the Afghan Choice bouquet of channels. The channel is available on satellite to the pashtun population of Asia and Middle East. It is also freely available through internet on Ustream.

Funding and Support
Noor Rahman Liwal an Afghan entrepreneur, philanthropist and his family are the investors in Pashto TV. Other sources of income include sale of broadcast content, Liwal Distance School Subscription, advertising, broadcasting Services.

Shows
The channel broadcasts Educational and mostly talk shows. The following is a list of notable shows :

Awards
2011 - Pashto TV and LDS (Liwal Distance School) were both nominated and won the manthan award in the category of E-EDUCATION & LEARNING in the year 2011.

2012 Special Mention Award, EUTELSAT TV AWARD 2012 in category Culture/Documentaries. In 2012 Pashto TV received special mention awarded in category Culture/Documentaries, there were more than 120 Participating Channels and about 20 in Culture/Documentaries, among the participants the Farsi1 sister channel of Lamar and Tolo TV.

N.R.Liwal, President Pashto TV profiled as Leader in Digital Media 2012 by Digital TV Europe, The Euro50 Special Issue

A special issue of Digital TV Europe that reflects and honours the achievements of individuals working across the pay-TV and broadband industries. An annual publication that's now in its eleventh year, the Euro50 celebrates those who have demonstrated outstanding leadership and vision in their fields and made a significant contribution to the strength of their organisation or the industry itself.
 
It has become the definitive “who’s who” of the year's most influential people in the broadband and pay-TV industries.

References

http://tolafghan.com/posts/22072
https://archive.today/20130222215850/http://www.dawat.no/index.php?mod=article&cat=%D8%A7%D9%81%D8%BA%D8%A7%D9%86%D8%A7%D9%86%D8%A7%D9%88%D8%AE%D8%A8%D8%B1%D8%AA%DB%8C%D8%A7%D9%88&article=5833

External links
Pashto TV Homepage
Pashto TV on Facebook

Television channels and stations established in 2011
Television stations in Afghanistan
Pashto mass media
Pashto-language television stations